Heart's Decree (Spanish: La ley del corazón), is a Colombian telenovela created by Mónica Agudelo Tenorio and adapted for television by Felipe Agudelo. It is dedicated to the memory of Agudelo after her death in 2012. It started airing on Colombian broadcast channel RCN Televisión on November 28, 2016. The series is available in 4K Ultra-high-definition television.

It stars Luciano D'Alessandro as Pablo Domínguez and Laura Londoño as Julia Escallón, with Sebastián Martínez, Iván López, Mabel Moreno, Lina Tejeiro, Rodrigo Candamil, Manuel Sarmiento, Mario Ruíz, Yesenia Valencia, Carlos Benjumea, Judy Henríquez, and Juan Pablo Barragán in the main roles respectively.

On June 12, 2017, RCN Televisión confirmed that the series would be renewed for a second season, which premiered on September 10, 2018. The show ended on April 22, 2019.

Plot summary  
The series takes place in a successful law firm specialized in family law, dedicated to cases of separation and in general to family and relationship conflicts. Pablo Domínguez (Luciano D'Alessandro), a partner at the firm Cabal-Ortega-Domínguez and associates, is going through a difficult situation in his life when separating from his wife Jimena (Carolina Acevedo). Suddenly, the lawyer meets his colleague Julia Escallón (Laura Londoño), who is about to marry Camilo Borrero (Sebastián Martínez), but a twist of fate will change her life and bring her closer to Pablo. The show features the love triangle between Julia, Pablo, and Camilo, and the twists and turns in the love lives of the other lawyers in the firm, with their personal lives often mirrored in the legal cases they are defending.

Cast

Main 
 Luciano D'Alessandro as Pablo Domínguez
 Laura Londoño as Julia Escallón
 Sebastián Martínez as Camilo Borrero
 Laura de León as Lucía Vallejo
 Iván López as Nicolás Ortega
 Mabel Moreno as María del Pilar Garcés
 Lina Tejeiro as Catalina Mejía
 Rodrigo Candamil as Alfredo Duperly
 Manuel Sarmiento as Iván Estéfan
 Mario Ruíz as Elías Rodríguez
 Yesenia Valencia as Rosa Ferro
 Carlos Benjumea as Hernando Cabal
 Judy Henríquez as Carmen Valdenebro
 Juan Pablo Barragán as Marcos Tibatá
 Jorge Cao as Alonso Duarte
 Alejandra Borrero as Adela Zambrano
 Fernando Arévalo as Murcial Mahecha
 Mario Espitia as Valentín Bechara
 Giovanna Andrade as Macarena Soler
 Carlos Congote as Tony Ricaurte

Recurring 
 Carolina Acevedo as Jimena Rivera
 Luz Stella Luengas as Tereza de Rivera
 Amparo Conde as Dolores Lolita
 Victoria Góngora as Isabel Triana de Rodríguez
 Jairo Camargo as Ramón Duperly
 María Helena Doering as Beatriz de Duperly
 Juan Pablo Posada as Roberto Martínez
 Helena Mallarino as María Cristina Correa
 Luis Fernando Bohórquez as Miguel
 Kimberly Reyes as Ana María
 Carolina López as Patricia Ramírez
 Estefanía Borge as Manuela Cáceres
 Mauricio Mejía as Darío
 Marianela González as Irene
 Brenda Hanst as Liliana González
 Javier Gnecco as Jaime Escallón
 Tuto Patiño as Patricio "Pato"
 Johan Velandia as Álvaro Durán
 Nicolás Rincón as Andrés Borrero
 Luly Bossa as Luisa Fernanda Barrera
 Florina Lemaitre as Natalia Santamaría
 Carolina Cuervo as Inés
 Juana del Río as María Fernanda Segura
 Juan Carlos Vargas as Rendón
 Santiago Bejarano as Zamora
 María José Martínez as Silvia López
 Marcos Gómez as Francisco
 Diego Camargo as Matías
 Kristina Lilley as María Eugenia Domínguez
 Pepe Sánchez as Samuel Ortega
 Jorge Cárdenas as Leonardo Tapia
 Margalida Castro as Doña Astrid
 Bibiana Navas as Yolanda
 Carla Giraldo as Josefina
 Patricia Castañeda as Marcela
 Ángela Piedrahíta as Patricia
 Andrés Suárez as Dr. Ángel
 Paula Castaño as Nina Grinberg
 Natasha Klauss as Jueza
 Gerardo Calero as Juez
 Juan David Agudelo as Mateo Zaragosa
 Norma Nivia as Esther
 Eileen Roca as Adelaida de Ricaurte
 Jorge Melo as Juez Paz
 Juan Sebastián Calero as Paul Ricaurte
 Abril Schreiber as Camila Salamanca
 Marcela Gallego as Belén
 Amparo Grisales as Iris Mendoza
 Andrea Gómez as Eloisa Jiménez
 Edinson Gil as Santiago Olarte Zambrano

Guest

Series overview 
<onlyinclude>

Adaptations 
After the success in Colombia, Televisa made an adaptation of the telenovela with the title of Por amar sin ley, this adaptation was released in 2018. On October 18, 2017, it was confirmed that the main actress of the series Grey's Anatomy Ellen Pompeo, would produce a version of the telenovela for the United States with the title of Big Law. On October 19, 2017, Mega acquired the rights to the telenovela to make its own version.

Ratings

Awards and nominations

References

External links 
 

2016 telenovelas
2016 Colombian television series debuts
2019 Colombian television series endings
RCN Televisión telenovelas
Spanish-language telenovelas
Colombian telenovelas
Television shows set in Colombia